Johnny B may refer to:

 "Johnny B" (song), song by The Hooters
 Jonathon Brandmeier (born 1956), American radio personality and musician known as Johnny B

See also
 Johnny Be Good, 1988 American comedy film directed by Bud Smith
 "Johnny B. Goode", 1958 rock-and-roll song written and first recorded by Chuck Berry and covered intensively